refers to one of six Japanese actors with family ties to classic kabuki theatre:

 Nakamura Utaemon I (1714–1791)
 Nakamura Utaemon II (1752-1798) 
 Nakamura Utaemon III (1778-1838) 
 Nakamura Utaemon IV (1798-1852) 
 Nakamura Utaemon V (1865-1940) 
 Nakamura Utaemon VI (1917-2001)